Angelo Garcia  (born March 28, 1976) is an American singer and songwriter of Puerto Rican descent, who was a member of Puerto Rican boy band Menudo from 1988 to 1990.

Career
A native New Yorker born in Brooklyn, New York, he barely spoke Spanish when he auditioned for a spot in the band Menudo after seeing a television commercial in Puerto Rico during a family vacation.

After almost three years with Menudo, García parted with the band and signed on with World Wide Entertainment. As a solo artist he recorded several songs including "Magic", "Yours So Completely", and a remake of singer Tiffany's hit song "Could've Been" but it was his single "Don't Keep Me Holding On" (written and produced by Lewis Martineé of Exposé fame) that became a success. In 1992, World Wide Entertainment sold García's recording contract to Warner Bros. Records for an undisclosed amount.

After parting with his former label, he released one semi-successful Spanish-language album for Warner simply titled "Angelo". After completing his secondary education and some music projects, he put his recording career on hold after he moved to Orlando, Florida, where he earned a communications degree from the University of Central Florida. After completing his studies, he helped in the launch of a women's gym franchise in Miami called Elements, before returning to New York City to restart his musical career.

Since 2004, García has written a number of original songs in both Spanish and English. During 2005, he participated in a reunion tour of former Menudo members Sergio Blass, Rawy Torres, and Robert Avellanet, performing under the name "Los Ultimos Heroes."  In order to preserve his artistic independence and avoid a clichéd reworking of the Menudo sound, García instead decided to record a solo album, using music he had personally written or collaborated on.

In 2006, García released a Spanish-language pop album titled Cool for which he wrote or co-wrote every song. One of the singles from Cool, a ballad entitled "Entregaré" (also known as "Si Es Así"), which García co-wrote with songwriter Roy Tavare, was featured in the 2006 motion picture Yellow starring Roselyn Sánchez.

In 2012, García began recording material for an English-language album, which is expected to be released in early 2013.

In May 2010, García posed for a series of semi-nude photographs for Paragon Men, a gay erotica website. In the interview which accompanied his photo shoot, Garcia openly discussed his homosexuality and his years of sexual self-exploration after leaving Menudo, even working briefly as a stripper and erotic dancer and performing at the now defunct Gaiety Theatre in New York City. He also refused to "out" his former bandmate Ricky Martin, who publicly disclosed his homosexuality a few weeks after García's interview. In 2012, Garcia joined forces with William Luque (who wrote his first Spanish hit "En Mis Sueños" which sold over 6 million copies worldwide) and began writing and recording a new English language dance-pop album in Madrid called Scandalous.  The title track "Scandalous" speaks about a child growing up in the spotlight and how having to grow up prematurely wreaked havoc on his adult life. It is set to be released in 2013/2014.

On May 7, 2015 Angelo Garcia disclosed in an exclusive interview on the Dr. Zoe Today show that he was sexually abused by a neighbor at 8 years old, by someone close to administration while in Menudo (band) from 11 years old to 14 years old, and again by a schoolteacher after he left the band. Inspired by the overwhelming response to his interview, the show opened their toll free number for listeners to call in sharing their own stories of sexual abuse and aired them on the following show titled, "Breaking the Silence" on May 14, 2015.

In an appearance on Tosh.0 he has stated that he is bisexual.

See also
List of Puerto Ricans

Discography

With Menudo 
 Sons of Rock (1988)
 Sombras y Figuras (1988)
 Los ultimos Heroes (1989)

References

External links
Official Website (Spanish-language music)
Official Website (English-language music)
Angelo Garcia on Twitter
Angelo Garcia on MySpace
Profile from University of Central Florida website
 

1976 births
American people of Puerto Rican descent
Menudo (band) members
Living people
Musicians from Brooklyn
University of Central Florida alumni
Male models from New York (state)
Bisexual musicians
Bisexual men
Hispanic and Latino American musicians
LGBT Hispanic and Latino American people
American LGBT singers